Walvisteuthis virilis is a species of squid from the family Onychoteuthidae, it is the type species of the genus Walvisteuthis. It may be synonymous with Walvisteuthis rancureli. The type specimen was collected a mature male with a mantle length of 71 mm collected near the Walvis Ridge in the eastern South Atlantic Ocean at a depth of 1000m. A second specimen was subsequently collected on the other side of the South Atlantic, also a mature male with a total length of 71mm.

References

Squid
Molluscs described in 1986